Wales Herald of Arms Extraordinary (Herodr Arbennig Cymru in Welsh) is a current Officer of Arms Extraordinary under the Courts of England and Wales' jurisdiction. Wales is a Royal Herald, ie a member of the Royal Household, and while not being a member of chapter of the College of Arms, processes with the other heralds at ceremonial occasions. Wales Herald forms an integral part of the procession when the British monarch officially opens a session of Senedd Cymru (Welsh Parliament) at Cardiff Bay. 

There was formerly a Wales Herald in the late 14th century, but that office was short-lived.  The post was re-established in 1963 as an Officer of Arms Extraordinary, its first appointee being Francis Jones.

The badge dates from 1967 and depicts a treasured medieval Welsh possession, the Croes Naid—a cross heavily gilded and jewelled and said to contain a fragment of the True Cross of Jesus Christ; it is blazoned Issuant from an open Royal Crown of the 13th century Or a representation of a Croes Naid also Or jewelled Proper.

The present Wales Herald of Arms Extraordinary is Thomas Lloyd, OBE, DL, FSA, having succeeded Michael Siddons in 2010.

Holders of the office

See also
 Herald
 Welsh heraldry

References
Citations

Bibliography
 The College of Arms, Queen Victoria Street : being the sixteenth and final monograph of the London Survey Committee, Walter H. Godfrey, assisted by Sir Anthony Wagner, with a complete list of the officers of arms, prepared by H. Stanford London, (London, 1963)
 A History of the College of Arms &c, Mark Noble, (London, 1804)

External links
The College of Arms
CUHGS Officer of Arms Index

English offices of arms